Cyrano: The Musical is a musical with music by Ad van Dijk, an original book and lyrics (in Dutch) by Koen van Dijk. For the Broadway production, English lyrics were provided by Peter Reeves, with additional lyrics by Sheldon Harnick.

Produced by Joop van den Ende, the original Dutch production Cyrano de Musical premiered in 1992 at the Stadsschouwburg (City Theatre) in Amsterdam. It is based on Edmond Rostand's classic 1897 play of the same name focusing on a love triangle involving the large-nosed poetic Cyrano de Bergerac, his beautiful cousin Roxane, and his classically handsome but inarticulate friend Christian de Neuvillette who, unaware of Cyrano's unrequited passion for Roxane, imposes upon him to provide the romantic words he can use to woo her successfully in mid-17th century Paris.

After 38 previews, the Broadway production, directed by Eddy Habbema, opened on November 21, 1993 at the Neil Simon Theatre, where it ran for 137 performances. The cast included Bill van Dijk as Cyrano, Anne Runolfsson as Roxane, and Paul Anthony Stewart as Christian, with James Barbour and Jeff Gardner in supporting roles.

The production garnered Tony Award nominations for Best Musical, Best Book of a Musical, Best Original Score, and Best Costume Design, and Runolfsson won the Drama League Award for her performance.

In addition to the Netherlands and the United States, the musical has been produced in Belgium, Germany, and Japan. Despite the show's critical success, no Broadway recording was ever produced.

Song list  

Act I       
Prologue - Man, Le Bret, Ragueneau, Ensemble
Opera, Opera - Ensemble
Aria - Montfleury, Cyrano, Ensemble
One Fragment of a Moment - Christian, Roxane
Confrontation - Ensemble
The Duel - Cyrano, Ensemble
Where's All This Anger Coming From - Le Bret, Cyrano
Loving Her - Cyrano, Christian
A Message from Roxane - Chaperone, Cyrano
Ragueneau's Patisserie - Ragueneau, Chefs, Waitresses
Roxane's Confession - Roxane, Cyrano
What a Reward - De Guiche, Le Bret, Ragueneau
Hate Me - Cyrano
Courage Makes a Man - Cadets, Captain
Cyrano's Story - Cyrano, Christian
A Letter for Roxane - Cyrano, Christian
I Have No Words - Christian
Two Musketeers - Cyrano, Christian
An Evening Made for Lovers - Ensemble
Balcony Scene - Roxane, Christian, Cyrano
Poetry - Cyrano, Roxane
Moonsong - Cyrano
Stay With Me! - Ensemble

Act II     
Every Day, Every Night - Cyrano, Christian, Roxane, Cadets
A White Sash - De Guiche, Cyrano, Cadets
When I Write - Cyrano
Two Musketeers (Reprise) - Christian, Cyrano
Rhyming Menu - Roxane, Rogueneau, Ensemble
Even Then - Roxane
Tell Her Now - Christian, Cyrano
The Evening - Cyrano, Cadets
Even Then (Reprise) - Roxane, Cyrano
The Battle - Ensemble 
Everything You Wrote - Roxane
He Loves To Make Us Laugh - Nuns, Mother Superior
A Visit from De Guiche - De Guiche, Roxane, Mother Superior
Opera, Opera (Reprise) - Ensemble
An Old Wound/The Letter/Moonsong - Cyrano, Roxane
|}

Awards and nominations

Original Broadway production

External links

New York Times review
 http://articles.latimes.com/keyword/newport-theatre-arts-center   September 1994

1992 musicals
Works based on Cyrano de Bergerac (play)
Broadway musicals
Musicals based on plays
Dutch musicals